Tuanku Tambusai Airport  is a domestic airport located in the Danausati village, district Rambah Samo, Rambah Samo County, Rokan Hulu, Riau, in Indonesia. It serves Pasir Pangaraian and surrounding areas. This airport is able to serve aircraft equivalent to BAe 146 and ATR 72.

Facilities 
 Telecommunication facilities (SSB, VHF) 
 Non-directional beacon (NDB) Navigation
 Facilities landing aids (PAPI, R / W Light) 
 Supporting aviation facilities and airport operations (generators, PLN) 
 Supporting facilities cost (windshock) 
 Space Arrival & Departure

Airlines and destinations

Statistic

References

Airports in Riau